Nurpur Rajputan  is a village in Kapurthala district of Punjab State, India. The village is administrated by a Sarpanch, who is an elected representative.

Demography 
According to the report published by Census India in 2011, Nurpur Rajputan has a total number of 78 houses and a population of 442 of which include 239 males and 203 females. Literacy rate of Nurpur Rajputan is 68.00%, lower than the state average of 75.84%.  The population of children under the age of 6 years is 42 which is 9.50% of the total population of Nurpur Rajputan, and the child sex ratio is approximately 826, lower than the state average of 846.

As per census 2011, 138 people were engaged in work activities out of the total population of Nurpur Rajputan which includes 129 males and 9 females. According to the census survey report 2011, 97.10% of workers describe their work as main work and 2.90% of workers are involved in Marginal activity providing a livelihood for less than 6 months.

Population data

Caste  
The village has scheduled caste (SC) constitutes 40.27% of the total population of the village and it doesn't have any Schedule Tribe (ST) population.

Air travel connectivity 
The closest airport to the village is Sri Guru Ram Dass Jee International Airport.

Villages in Kapurthala

References

External links
  Villages in Kapurthala
 Kapurthala Villages List

Villages in Kapurthala district